Anatole is an animated children's television series based on the Anatole book series by Eve Titus.  The series was created by Scottish Television, Valentine Productions s.a.r.l. and Nelvana as one of their numerous programmes. It originally aired on Canada's YTV network from 1998 to 1999, and premiered in the United States on CBS on October 3, 1998, and aired through the 1998–99 television season.

Premise
The series tells the story of Anatole, a mouse who lives in Paris. He works as a night watchman in a cheese factory. He has a wife, Doucette, and a family of six little mice.

Characters

Main
 Anatole, the series' lead
 Gaston, Anatole's friend
 Doucette, Anatole's wife
 Paul, Anatole's oldest son
 Paulette, Anatole's oldest daughter
 Claude, Anatole's middle son
 Claudette, Anatole's middle daughter
 Georges, Anatole's youngest son
 Georgette, Anatole's youngest daughter
 Pamplemousse, the mayor of the mouse village

Supporting

 Edgar
 Molière
 Rene
 Yvette
 Mayor Soucy
 Pascal
 Uncle Louis
 M. Duval
 Monsieur Duval
 Charlemagne the Cat
 Pierre the Pigeon
 Otto
 Gretchen
 Hans
 Nathalie
 Comtesse De Souris
 Maurice
 Jacques
 The Two Crows
 Nostromo
 The Bakers
 Thief
 Uncle Louis
 Two weasels
 Mayor Soucy
 Pascal

Production
CBS announced in January 1998 that it would return to airing cartoons as part of its Saturday morning programming schedule for the 1998–99 television season, and Anatole was among the new animated series announced. In July 1998, it was announced that CBS would premiere Anatole and the rest of its Saturday morning animated programming on September 19, 1998, though by September the premiere date had slipped to October 3, 1998.

Episodes
Charles E. Bastien directed every episode of Anatole.

Broadcast and home media

The series originally aired in 1998, on  CBS Kidshow on CBS. In late 1999 it aired on Premiere 12 (now known as Okto) in Singapore.

It re-aired on the U.S. version of Disney Channel from 2001 to 2004. The series was returned in 2009 on STV, a Scottish television station, on their wknd@stv strand, and from 2015 as part of the "Weans' World" block on STV Glasgow and STV Edinburgh.

In the late 1990s, Alliance Atlantis released videotapes of the series.

References

External links

Anatole on STV Player

1990s Canadian animated television series
1990s British animated television series
1990s French animated television series
1998 Canadian television series debuts
1999 Canadian television series endings
1998 British television series debuts
1999 British television series endings
1998 French television series debuts
1999 French television series endings
French children's animated television series
Canadian children's animated television series
British children's animated television shows
CBS original programming
YTV (Canadian TV channel) original programming
French television shows based on children's books
Canadian television shows based on children's books
British television shows based on children's books
Television series by Nelvana
Animated television series about mice and rats
Television shows set in Paris